Glorification may have several meanings in Christianity. From the Catholic canonization to the similar sainthood of the Eastern Orthodox Church to salvation in Christianity in Protestant beliefs, the glorification of the human condition can be a long and arduous process.

Catholicism

The Catholic Church teaches that, "at the end of time, the Kingdom of God will come in its fullness. After the universal judgment, the righteous will reign for ever with Christ, glorified in body and soul. the universe itself will be renewed. [...] The visible universe, then, is itself destined to be transformed, 'so that the world itself, restored to its original state, facing no further obstacles, should be at the service of the just'," sharing their glorification in the risen Jesus Christ."

The act of canonization, which in the Catholic Church is not normally called glorification, since in the theological sense it is God, not the Church, who glorifies, is reserved, both in the Latin Church and the Eastern Catholic Churches, to the Apostolic See and occurs at the conclusion of a long process requiring extensive proof that the candidate for canonization lived and died in such an exemplary and holy way that he is worthy to be recognized as a saint. The Church's official recognition of sanctity implies that the person is now in Heaven and may be publicly invoked.

Canonization is a decree that the name of the saint be inscribed in the Roman Martyrology and that veneration be given to the saint universally within the Church. Veneration within the liturgy is regulated by the norms of the individual liturgical rite. On most weekdays of the year, if no solemnity, feast or obligatory memorial is assigned to that day, the Roman Rite allows celebration of the Mass of any Saint inscribed in the Martyrology for that day.

Beatification is a decree permitting public veneration in a limited geographical area or within certain communities, such as a religious institute.

Eastern Orthodox Church

The Eastern  Orthodox Church, as, for instance, the Orthodox Church in America, uses the term "glorification" to refer to the official recognition of a person as a saint of the Church.

The Russian Orthodox Church uses both канонизация "canonization" and прославление "glorification."

Oriental Orthodox Church
The Oriental Orthodox Churches also hold a doctrinal tradition similar to the Eastern Orthodox Churches whereby martyrs are not in need of any formal glorification. With time, the greatness of their sanctity which is venerated by the faithful is recognized by the Church. In the words of Armenian Patriarch H. H. Karekin II,  This is in conformity with the tradition of other Churches in the Oriental Orthodox family such as Coptic Orthodox Church, Syriac Orthodox Church, Ethiopian Orthodox Church and Indian Orthodox Church. The instances of glorification of the 21 Coptic martyrs in 2015 or the victims of Armenian genocide of 1915 simply serve as official recognition given by the hierarchs to the steadfast faith of those who laid down their lives in defense of their Christian identity.

Reformed Churches

There are two events that occur during glorification, these are "the receiving of perfection by the elect before entering into the kingdom of heaven," and  "the receiving of the resurrection bodies by the elect".

Glorification is the third stage of Christian development.  The first being justification, then sanctification, and finally glorification. (Rom. 8:28-30) Glorification is the completion, the consummation, the perfection, and the full realization of salvation.

Receiving of perfection
Glorification is the means by which the elect are delivered from their sins before entering into the kingdom of Heaven. According to Reformed Christians, glorification is a continuous, flowing process, whereby believers in Jesus the Christ, who have either died or who are raptured alive (called up into heaven), receive glorified, perfect bodies and souls, sinless and Christlike. It is not a painful process.

Jerry L. Walls and James B. Gould have likened that process to the core or sanctification view of purgatory. "Grace is much more than forgiveness, it is also transformation and sanctification, and finally, glorification. We need more than forgiveness and justification to purge our sinful dispositions and make us fully ready for heaven. Purgatory is nothing more than the continuation of the sanctifying grace we need, for as long as necessary to complete the job".

Glorification is the Reformed alternative to purgatory. According to the theologies of most major Protestant groups, purgatory is a doctrine of the Catholic Church, a holding place for those whose lives were dominated by venial sins but not guilty of mortal sins.

Receiving of the resurrection bodies
After the final judgement, all the righteous dead shall arise and their bodies will be perfected and will become a glorified body. Only then can they enter heaven. To paraphrase C. S. Lewis's Weight of Glory: "If we were to see them in their glorified forms we would be tempted to bow down and worship them."

References

External links
Protestantism
 http://www.abideinchrist.com/keys/sanctification-perfect.html
 http://www.sdanet.org/atissue/books/wws/salv17.htm

Christian terminology
Posthumous recognitions
Christian practices
Christian saints

it:Glorificazione